Madhuca insignis is a species of plant in the family Sapotaceae. It is endemic to India. It had been declared extinct due to habitat loss. However, a Madhuca insignis population has been rediscovered along the banks of the river Kumaradhara, in Dakshina Kannada region of Karnataka state, India. The area is the proposed site for the Kukke I and Kukke II hydel power projects. Restoration efforts of the species are being attempted.

References

insignis
Endemic flora of India (region)
Flora of Kerala
Flora of Karnataka
Taxonomy articles created by Polbot
Critically endangered flora of Asia